Marušići is a small Croatian village located on the slopes of Dinara mountain, in the east part of the Omiš Riviera of the Adriatic Sea, as well as the village of Šestanovac north of Omiš,  from Split, and  from Makarska.  

According to the 2001 census, Marušići had 203 residents. The main economic activities of the village are tourism, wine, olive and fruit. The village has a church, an olive mill, a store, and several restaurants.

Marusic is a known royal family dating back to the 13th century. It is said they used to carry slaves from northern part of Africa in today's Morocco. Those who live in the northern mountains of Croatia were said to be banished from the family, and mixed race with the slaves at the time.

External links
 Marušići on Omiš tourist board website

Populated places in Split-Dalmatia County